Morley House may refer to:

in Canada
Morley House, a modern-style house in Aylmer, Quebec designed by James Strutt

in England
Morley Manor, Derbyshire
Morley House, the building of the Junior School of Lewes Old Grammar School in Lewes, East Sussex
Morley Old Hall, near Norwich, in Norfolk, a Grade I-listed manor house
Saltram House, Plympton, Plymouth, former home to the Earls of Morley

in the United States
Edward W. Morley House, West Hartford, Connecticut, listed on the NRHP in Hartford County, Connecticut
W.G. Morley House, Bloomfield Hills, Michigan, designed by Marcus Burrowes
Lewis Morley House, Painesville, Ohio, listed on the NRHP in Lake County, Ohio
Raymond-Morley House, Austin, Texas, listed on the NRHP in Travis County, Texas